Gypsoplacaceae is a family of lichenized fungi in the order Lecanorales. This is a monotypic family, containing the single genus Gypsoplaca, which has a widespread distribution. The family and genus were described as new in 1990 by Norwegian lichenologist Einar Timdal. Gypsoplaca originally contained only the type species, Gypsoplaca macrophylla, but four species were added to the genus in 2018.

Species
Gypsoplaca alpina 
Gypsoplaca blastidiata 
Gypsoplaca bullata 
Gypsoplaca macrophylla 
Gypsoplaca rosulata

References

Lecanorales
Lichen genera
Lecanorales genera
Taxa described in 1990
Taxa named by Einar Timdal